Edarikode is a village Panchayat near the Municipal  town of Kottakkal, in Malappuram district of Kerala state. Kottakkal and  Edarikode jointly  can be treated as Ayurveda Nagara.pkmmhss , gups clari , ysc ground edarikode very famous

Transportation
Edarikkode village connects to other parts of India through Kottakkal town.  National highway No.66 passes through Kottakkal and the northern stretch connects to Goa and Mumbai.  The southern stretch connects to Cochin and Thiruvananthapuram.  State Highway No.28 starts from Nilambur and connects to Ooty, Mysore and Bangalore through Highways.12,29 and 181. National Highway No.966 connects to Palakkad and Coimbatore.  

 Railway Station: Tirur railway station is one of the major railway stations in the Malabar region. Almost every train stops here, connecting the Malappuram district to the rest of the country.
 Nearest Airport: Calicut International Airport is approximately 25 kilometres away.

References

Cities and towns in Malappuram district
Kottakkal area